M&C Saatchi Group is an international communications network headquartered in London, formed in May 1995. With more than 2,400 staff, the network spans 23 countries with major hubs in the UK, Europe, US, Middle East & Africa, Asia and Australia. 

M&C Saatchi Group claims to be the world's largest independent communications network. 

The Group is listed on the AIM Board of the London Stock Exchange.

In May 2022, Next Fifteen Communications Group agreed to buy M&C Saatchi Group for $387.2 million.

History 
M&C Saatchi Group started as an advertising agency in 1995, founded by Maurice & Charles Saatchi, Jeremy Sinclair, Bill Muirhead and David Kershaw, in a split from Saatchi & Saatchi. A number of Saatchi and Saatchi's London management and creative staff also joined and then some clients soon followed including Gallaher Group, Mirror Newspapers, the retailer Dixons and after a competitive pitch, British Airways and its part subsidiary Qantas as well as the Conservative Party, for whom they made the infamous New Labour, New Danger adverts. By early 1996, the network consisted of offices in London, Singapore, Hong Kong, Sydney, New York and Auckland. In 2020, the Group operated in 24 countries around the world, with regional central hubs in London, New York, Milan, Cape Town, Sydney and Singapore.

In 2019, some accounting errors from previous financial years were discovered. Problems included the early recognition of revenue for projects not fully completed and the capitalising of assets which ought to have been expensed. The issues were brought to the attention of the PLC directors and an announcement was made that charges of £6.4M would be booked in the 2019 year relating to either 2018 or 2019. PricewaterhouseCoopers were appointed as independent advisors to review and confirm findings. In December 2019, the Board announced the total charges would in fact be £11.6M. The company's original auditor KPMG resigned earlier in 2019.

It was reported that the agency's client, the Financial Conduct Authority – Britain's financial watchdog - issued a formal request for information to examine M&C's disclosure of the accounting problems which prompted the share price fall.

In January 2021, the founders of the agency stepped down and Moray Maclennan became the new CEO. In January 2021, M&C Saatchi Group hosted a virtual capital markets event for institutional investors and analysts, where they announced a new strategy and operating model. The new mantra 'We Navigate, Create and Lead Meaningful Change' was launched, described by MacLennan as a 'new chapter' for M&C Saatchi. Following this launch and announcement of positive financial results, the M&C Saatchi plc share price rallied, jumping from 90p to 150p in early March 2021.

Structure 
Moray MacLennan, Chief Executive Officer, Gareth Davis, Non-Executive Chairman, Mickey Kalifa, Group Finance Director and Vin Murria, Lisa Gordon, Colin Jones, Louise Jackson and Bill Muirhead make up the M&C Saatchi Board as of 2021.

The Group operates in the US, UK, Europe, EMEA, Asia and Australia through six hubs in New York, London, Milan, Cape Town, Singapore and Sydney.

Awards 

Agency Awards include:

 Agency of the Year Campaign Awards, M&C Saatchi Indonesia, 2021.
 Agency of the Decade, NC Digital Awards, M&C Saatchi Milano, 2021.
 Most Innovative Company, Australian Financial Review Awards,  M&C Saatchi Australia Group, 2017, 2019.
 Agency of the Decade, Mobile Marketing Effectiveness Awards, M&C Saatchi Performance (formerly known as M&C Saatchi Mobile), 2020.
 Large Agency of the Year, FM Adfocus Awards, M&C Saatchi Abel, 2019.
 Agency of the Year, BT Sport Industry Awards, M&C Saatchi Sport & Entertainment, 6 times winners. 
 Leading Consultants, Financial Times, Clear M&C Saatchi, 2017–21. 
 Large Consultancy of the Year, UK Sponsorship Awards, M&C Saatchi Sport & Entertainment, 2019. 
 Most Effective Media Agency The Drum, M&C Saatchi Performance, 2015, 2016, 2017, 2018.
 Digital Agency of the Year, The DADI Awards, M&C Saatchi Performance, 2016.
 Consultancy of the Year, PR Week, M&C Saatchi PR, 2017.
 Agency of the Year, Campaign Asia-Pacific, M&C Saatchi Australia Group, 2015.
 Creative Talent Management Agency of the Year, Business Excellence Awards from Acquisition International Magazine, M&C Saatchi Merlin, 2014.

Work Awards include:

 Effie Awards, Golds in: David vs. Goliath, Travel & Tourism and Small Budgets - Services, for 'Looks Like You Need to Let It Out' for Promote Iceland, 2021.

 PR Week Awards, Winner Global Integration, Looks Like You Need To Let it Out' for Promote Iceland, 2021.

 Fast Company World Changing Idea, 'The Street Store' for Haven Shelter, 2020.

 D&AD Graphite Pencil – 'rightmyname' for Nandos, M&C Saatchi Abel, 2019.
 APG Creative Strategy Award, Long-Term Thinking, 'Change4Life' for PHE, 2019.
 Loeries Grand Prix, 'Afrotising' for Nando's.
 Cannes Lions Titanium Lion Wood Pencil, 'Clever Buoy' for Optus, 2015.
 IPA Effectiveness Award, 'Be Clear on Cancer' for PHE, 2014.
 BAFTA, Best Comedy and Entertainment Show, for A League of their Own, 2014.
 IPA Effectiveness Award, London 2012 Olympics Campaign, 2012.

References

External links 
 Official website

Advertising agencies of the United Kingdom
Business services companies of the United Kingdom
Mass media companies of the United Kingdom
Marketing companies established in 1995
Saatchi family